Khanom khrok or coconut-rice pancakes is a traditional Thai dessert. They are prepared by mixing rice flour, sugar, and coconut milk to form a dough. Usually, khanom khrok is composed of two batters, one salty and one sweet, both of which are cooked in a heating mantle–a hot indented frying pan.  After heating, khanom khrok will be picked out of the mantle and the two half-circular doughs formed into a circular shape.

Khanom khrok is fragrant, sweet and the texture is also smooth from the coconut milk. Similar dishes can also be found in Bangladesh, Myanmar (where it is known as mont lin maya), Laos, Cambodia, South India (where it is called as Paddu, Paniyaram or Gundpongalu) and Indonesia (where it is called serabi).

Overview
Ingredients typically include coconut milk and rice flour. Additional ingredients may include sugar, tapioca or arrowroot flour, white rice, shredded coconut, peanut or corn oil, green onions, corn, taro, pandan essence and cilantro. The mixture is poured within the dimples on a hot heating mantle.

History
Khanom khrok was well-known since Ayutthaya period. And at that time was the beginning of a heating mantle–a hot indented frying pan. First, the dough made by rice immersed in water and mill with thin coconut milk, cooked rice, and shredded coconut that put a little salt then top with undiluted coconut milk. But for the Royal Thai version, they adapt the top of Khanom Khrok to become more diverse. Such as corn top, scallion top, and shrimp top.

See also

 Kuzhi paniyaram
 List of Thai desserts
 List of Thai dishes (includes names in Thai script)
 List of Thai ingredients (includes names in Thai script)
 Thai cuisine

References

Thai desserts and snacks
Foods containing coconut
Rice cakes